The Island of Doctor Moron is a rock musical written by Chris Dockrill, with music by his wife Lyn Dockrill.

Production 
The original version of the musical was performed at Kempsey High School, where Chris Dockrill had previously taught, in 1998, but a refined version of the show had its official world premiere at The New Olympia Theatre in Paddington, New South Wales on 4 November 2014. The theatre was previously the long-deserted Palace Academy Twin Cinema, which the Dockrills bought, refurbished, and renamed in deference to its original 1919 name. The season ran from 4 November to 6 December 2014, with the show's popularity growing to sell-out performances in the 250-seat theatre over the final two weeks.

Musicians 
The musicians for the world premiere production of The Island of Doctor Moron were: 
Kelly Bryant - Backing Vocalist
Jane Eller - Backing Vocalist
Lyn Dockrill - Backing Vocalist
Paul Robert Burton - Acoustic Bass, Guitarlele
Michael Hawke - Soprano, Alto, Tenor Sax/flute, harmonica
Andrew Toner - acoustic/electric guitars
Andrew Byrnes - drums
Craig Morrison – percussion

Production Team 
The production team of the world premiere production of The Island of Doctor Moron were:
Executive Producer – Chris Dockrill 
Executive Musical Director - Lyn Dockrill
Musical Director - Paul Robert Burton
Production manager - Luke Dockrill
Art and Design Director - Chris Austin
Audio Engineer - Phil "Kez" Kesby
Choreographer - David Camm
Lighting Designer – Billy Mawer

Recordings

A CD live cast recording of all songs in the show was produced in October–November, 2014 

The Band consisted of: 
Andrew Toner - acoustic/electric guitars
Andrew Byrnes - drums
Craig Morrison - percussion
Paul Robert Burton – Acoustic Bass, guitarlele  and harmonica
Michael Hawke – Soprano, Alto, Tenor Sax/flute, harmonica
Lead vocalists: Lyndell Arthur, James Berkley, Cramer Cain, Jess D’Souza, James Jonathon, Bree Langridge, Nana Matapule, Wayne McDaniel, Amanda Stella Webb 
Backing vocalists: Kelly Bryant, Lyn Dockrill, Jane Eller

Disc 1 (Songs from Act 1):

1.	Overture

2.	Stranded – Lyndell Arthur

3.	Valma's Drums

4.	Mission Statement – Lead Vocals: Wayne McDaniel

5.	What'd I Do? – Lead Vocals: Bree Langridge

6.	Voodoo Zydecoo – Lead Vocals: Cramer Cain

7.	Jungle Fever – Lead Vocals: Bree Langridge

8.	Slave Market Junkie – Lead Vocals: James Jonathon

9.	Moron Rules OK – Lead Vocals: James Berkley Harrison III

10.	It Ain’t Easy Bein’ a Voodoo Queen – Lead Vocals: Bree Langridge

11.	Doctor's Orders – Lead Vocals: Lyndell Arthur

Disc 2 (Songs from Act 2)

1.	Reprise

2.	House of Pain – Lead Vocals: Jessica D’Souza

3.	Gaol House Blues – Lead Vocals: Amanda Stella Webb

4.	Genetic Mutation – Vocals: James Berkley Harrison III, Lyndell Arthur, Nick Jones, Nana Matapule, Amanda Stella Webb and Jessica D’Souza

5.	Pull of the Tide – Lead Vocals: Amanda Stella Webb

6.	Animal Nights – Lead Vocals: James Jonathon

7.	Reversion Blues – Lead Vocals: Nana Matapule

8.	The Way I Feel For You – Lead Vocals: Amanda Stella Webb

9.	Swamp Boogie - Lead Vocals: Wayne McDaniel 

10.	You Bring Out The Beast in Me – Lead Vocals: Amanda Stella Webb, Wayne McDaniel, Jessica D’Souza, Bree Langridge, Steve Maresca and James Berkley Harrison III

Synopsis

A raging storm at sea surrounds the audience, who follow the adventures of Edwyna and Douggie. The two are shipwrecked and befall multiple misfortunes, eventually ending up in the cave of Doctor Moron. There, they are mauled, cajoled, and played with by the doctor's strange experiments: mutated half-animal-half-human creatures. All narrative threads ultimately lead to Doctor Moron, his devoted woman, Mona, and his maniacal quest to unleash the beast in all humans.

Cast

The cast of the world premiere production of The Island of Doctor Moron were :

 James Berkley Harrison III - Doctor Moron
 Bree Langridge - Voodoo Valma
 Cramer Cain - Balthasar
 Lyndell Arthur - Eddie
 Steve Maresca - Douggie
 Amanda Webb - Mona
 Andrew Mead - Schnapps
 Wayne McDaniels - Brother Bob
 James Johnathon - Rubber Gloves
 Jess D'Souza - Cheetah
 Nana Matapule - Kong
 Tim Victory - Fitter
 Jimmy Chapman - Turner
 Nick Jones - Steele/Testosterone
 David Camm - Three Dogs/Jekyll
 Jenna Kratzael - Two Dogs
 Katerine Munro - Humbug
 Dance Ensemble: Catherine Bolitho, Nicole Harring, Amy Gill, Rosemarie Romeo, Sophie Campbell, Tanika Layt, Chris Hains, Lukas Rose, Steve Williams

Reception

An early review of a technical rehearsal, published three days prior to the opening of the show to the public was negative – "Not quite the next Rocky Horror",  however subsequent media responses based on the actual performances before paying audiences were all positive.  The script and playing time was reduced by 22 minutes prior to opening night and production was tightened in the first week of the season. 

The show went on to receive positive responses from many sources, including from Alan Jones, Alternative Media Group of Australia, Australian Musician Magazine, Canterbury Torch, the Central Coast Express, Central Sydney Magazine, the Daily Telegraph, Macleay Argus, Time Out Australia, St George and Sutherland Shire Leader, and the Wentworth Courier.

References

External links
 
 List of rock musicals

2014 musicals
Australian musicals
Original musicals
Rock musicals